Fairchild House is a 1950 apartment block on the Pitfield Estate in Hoxton, London.

It is a six-storey building of council housing. The Twentieth Century Society notes "the lavish treatment of its Northern elevation".

References

Buildings and structures in the London Borough of Hackney
Residential buildings completed in 1950
Hoxton